Gianni Dellacasa (born 9 July 1961) is an Italian football manager.

References

1961 births
Living people
Italian football managers
AC Bellinzona managers
FC Winterthur managers
Neuchâtel Xamax FCS managers
FC Sion managers
U.S. Cremonese managers
FC Lugano managers
FC Chiasso managers
Vasas SC managers
ES Sétif managers
Italian expatriate football managers
Italian expatriate sportspeople in Switzerland
Italian expatriate sportspeople in Hungary
Italian expatriate sportspeople in Algeria